Washington and Lee University is led by a president selected by the Board of Trustees. The university was founded in 1749 as Augusta Academy. It later became Liberty Hall Academy (1782), Washington Academy (1798), Washington College (1813), and finally Washington and Lee University (1871). The office of president was not created until 1782.

Presidents

 Robert Alexander, Augusta Academy 1749–1762
 John Brown, Augusta Academy 1762–1776
 William Graham, Liberty Hall Academy 1782–1796
 Samuel Legrande Campbell, Liberty Hall Academy 1797–1798, Washington Academy 1798–1799
 Rev. George A. Baxter, Washington Academy 1799–1813, Washington College 1813–1829
 Rev. Henry Ruffner (acting), Washington College 1829–1830, 1834
 Louis Marshall, Washington College 1830–1834
 Henry Vethake, Washington College 1834–1836
 Rev. Henry Ruffner, Washington College 1836–1848
 Rev. George Junkin, Washington College 1848–1861 (vacant), Washington College 1861–1865
 Robert E. Lee, Washington College 1865–1870
 George Washington Custis Lee, 1871–1897
 William Lyne Wilson, 1897–1900
 Henry St. George Tucker III (acting), 1900–1901
 George H. Denny, 1901–1911
 Henry D. Campbell (acting) and John L. Campbell (acting), 1911–1912
 Henry L. Smith 1912–1929
 Robert H. Tucker (acting), 1930
 Francis Pendleton Gaines 1930–1959
 Fred C. Cole, 1959–1967
 William Webb Pusey III (acting), 1967–1968
 Robert E. R. Huntley, 1968–1983
 John Delane Wilson 1983–1995
 John William Elrod 1995–2001
 H. Laurent Boetsch Jr. (acting) 2001–2002
 Thomas Gerard Burish, 2002–2005
 Harlan Ray Beckley (acting), 2005–2006
 Kenneth Patrick Ruscio, 2006–2016
 William C. Dudley, 2017–present

References

History of Washington and Lee's Presidents

Washington and Lee University presidents
Washington and Lee